Eivind Aarset (born 23 March 1961) is a Norwegian guitarist who has worked with Ray Charles, Dee Dee Bridgewater, Ute Lemper, Ketil Bjørnstad, Andy Sheppard, Mike Mainieri, Arild Andersen, Abraham Laboriel, Dhafer Youssef, Django Bates, and Nils Petter Molvaer. Aarset is married to Norwegian singer Anne-Marie Giørtz.

Biography 
Aarset has worked with Nils Petter Molvær, Bill Laswell, Jon Hassell, Jan Garbarek, David Sylvian, and Marilyn Mazur.

After several albums for Jazzland, he recorded Dream Logic for ECM (2012), collaborating with Jan Bang and Erik Honoré on the production and timbral design of melodies and soundscapes. His style has been associated with nu jazz and electronic music.

At the 2013 Punkt Festival in Kristiansand, Norway, he accompanied Arve Henriksen, Jan Bang, Erik Honoré, and Ingar Zach, celebrating the release of Narrative from the Subtropics by Jan Bang and Places of Worship by Arve Henriksens, in addition to performing a special "Dream Logic" concert with Jan Bang, Audun Erlien, Wetle Holte and Erland Dahlen.

John Kellman at All About Jazz named Eivind Aarset Dream Logic's appearance at Punktfestivalen, Kristiansand, Norway in September 2013 one of the 25 Best Live Shows of 2013.

References

External links 

Interview at La Hoja de Arena (in Spanish)
Interview about "Électronique Noire" (in Norwegian)

1961 births
Living people
20th-century Norwegian male musicians
21st-century Norwegian male musicians
20th-century Norwegian guitarists
21st-century Norwegian guitarists
Musicians from Kolbotn
Male jazz composers
Norwegian jazz guitarists
Norwegian jazz composers
Nu jazz musicians
Ableton Live users
Ab und Zu members
ECM Records artists
EmArcy Records artists
Jazzland Recordings (1997) artists